is a 1987 Japanese adult animated dark fantasy action horror film produced by Video Art and Madhouse for Japan Home Video. Based on Black Guard, the first novel of the Wicked City series by Hideyuki Kikuchi, the film is the solo directorial debut of Yoshiaki Kawajiri, who also served as the character designer, storyboard artist, animation director and a key animator.

The story takes place towards the end of the 20th century and explores the idea that the human world secretly coexists with the demon world with a secret police force known as the Black Guard protecting the boundary.

Plot 
The existence of the "Black World"—an alternate dimension populated by supernatural demons—is known to few humans. For centuries, a peace treaty between the Black World and the world of humans has been maintained to ensure relative harmony. Both sides of the continuum are protected by an organization of secret agents called the Black Guard, specifically from a group of radicalized members of the Black World.

In Tokyo, Renzaburō Taki, a salaryman for an electronics company by day, and a Black Guard when needed, has casual sex with Kanako, a young woman who he has been meeting at a local bar for three months. Kanako reveals herself to be a spider-like doppelgänger from the Black World Radicals and escapes with a sample of Taki's semen after attempting to kill him. The next day, Taki is assigned to protect Giuseppe Mayart, a comical and perverted 200-year-old mystic who is a signatory for a ratified treaty between the Human World and the Black World, and a target for the Radicals. Taki is also informed that he will be working with a partner: a Black Guard from the Black World.

While awaiting Mayart's arrival at Narita, Taki is attacked by two Radicals at the runway, but is saved by his partner—a beautiful fashion model named Makie. Taki and Makie eventually meet Mayart; the trio take shelter in a Hibiya hotel with spiritual barriers to protect it from Radicals. While playing chess to pass time, the hotelier explains to Taki, who is unsure of his responsibilities within the Black Guard, that he will only value his position once he knows what he is protecting. During an assault on the hotel by a Radical, Mayart sneaks out.

Makie and Taki find him in a soapland in the grip of a Radical who has sapped his health, prompting a frantic trip to a spiritual hospital under Black Guard protection. Halfway there, Makie is taken prisoner by a tentacle demon, and Taki is forced to leave her behind. Upon their arrival at the clinic, Mayart begins his recovery, while Mr. Shadow—the leader of the Radicals—uses a psychic projection to taunt Taki into rescuing Makie. Ignoring Mayart's threats that he will be fired, he pursues Shadow to a dilapidated building far from the hospital, where he finds Makie being gang raped by Radicals. A female Radical attempts to seduce Taki, asking him if he ever copulated with Makie, but he kills her and the Radicals violating Makie, and wounds Shadow.

While tending to each other, Makie reveals to Taki that she was once romantically involved with a member of the Radicals, and that she joined the Black Guard because of her belief in the need for peace between the two worlds. Upon returning to the clinic, the pair are fired by Taki's superior, who deems Taki's desires a liability to his duties. While driving through a tunnel with a stowaway Mayart, they are ensnared by Kanako, who—having determined that Taki and Makie were partnered for genetic reasons—attempts to kill them again. Bolts of supernatural lightning kill Kanako, while Taki and Makie are wounded. They later awaken inside a church, and passionately make love.

A final attack by Shadow comes against Taki and Makie, which is deflected by more lightning generated by a surprisingly healthy Mayart, who reveals that he was actually hired to protect his "bodyguards". Mayart and Taki almost succeed in defeating Shadow, but the final blow comes from Makie, whose powers have increased due to her being impregnated by Taki. Mayart explains that the two are essential to the new peace treaty; Taki and Makie were selected to be the first couple from both worlds that can produce half-human, half-demon children, and their bond will be instrumental in ensuring everlasting peace between the two worlds. Although angry with Mayart because they were not informed of the Black Guard's plans, Taki implicitly admits that he has fallen for Makie and, per the hotelier's advice, wants to protect her and their child. The trio leave to attend the peace ceremony. Taki remains in the Black Guard to ensure the protection of both worlds and his loved ones.

Cast

Production 
Yoshiaki Kawajiri had just completed his work directing The Running Man, a segment from the portmanteau film Neo-Tokyo (1987), and was asked to direct a 35-minute OVA short film based on Hideyuki Kikuchi's novel. Writing under the pseudonym "Kisei Chō", Norio Osada's original draft of the screenplay began with Makie's saving of Taki from two demons at Narita, and ended with Taki's first battle with Mr. Shadow and rescue of Makie. After Japan Home Video were shown the first 15 minutes of completed animation, they were impressed enough with Kawajiri's work that the runtime was extended to 80 minutes. Kawajiri saw this as an opportunity to explore more characterization and created more animation for the start, the middle and the end. The project was completed in under a year.

Release 
Although classified as OVA by JHV, it was released theatrically in Japan by Joy Pack Film on 19 April 1987 and received a western release dubbed by Streamline Pictures under the name Wicked City on 20 August 1993. After Streamline Pictures lost the distribution rights, it was licensed and distributed by Urban Vision. A censored version of the film was distributed by Manga Entertainment in the UK with a different dub. Both the Streamline and Manga UK dubs were released in Australia, with the Manga UK dub being released on VHS in 1994. In 1995, Manga Video released in Australia a bundle VHS consisting of Wicked City and Monster City, this version containing the Streamline dub. In 1997 when Madman Entertainment was named distributor for Manga in Australia, the Streamline dub was released on a single tape, and the Manga UK version was phased out. On 26 July 2015, Discotek Media announced at their Otakon panel that they have acquired the movie and re-released the movie on DVD in 2016 with a new video transfer and with both Streamline and Manga UK English dubs. On 28 September 2018, Toei announced a Region 2 Blu-ray release of the OVA to be released on 9 January 2019.

Critical reception 
Charles Solomon of the Los Angeles Times stated that the film epitomizes the "sadistic, misogynistic erotica" popular in Japan. He noted that Yoshiaki Kawajiri composes scenes like a live-action filmmaker, and complimented his deft cutting and camera angles, but felt that the "Saturday-morning style animation" and juvenile story did not warrant the effort. Solomon also opined that Kisei Choo's screenplay was inscrutable. Solomon concluded his review by touching upon the belief that there is a connection between screen violence and real-life violence by pointing out that Japan is one of the least violent societies in the industrialized world.

Desson Howe of The Washington Post, who observed the level of violence toward women in the film, characterized it as a "post-Chandler, quasi-cyberpunky violence fest". Howe found the film compelling for its "gymnastic" camera angles, its kinetic pace and imaginative (if slightly twisted) images." He also found the English dubbing laughable, though he saw ominous subtext in various bits of dialogue and other moments in the film.

Richard Harrigton, also of The Washington Post, saw the film as an attempt to create the Blade Runner of Japanese animation, citing its distinctively languid pace, linear storytelling and gradual exposition. Harrington also detected a Brave New World subtext, and calling it "stylish and erotic, exciting in its limited confrontations and provocative in its ambition."

Marc Savlov of The Austin Chronicle gave the film two and a half out of five stars, calling it a "better-than-average" treatment of the "demons from an alternate universe" subject matter. Savlov stated that the film was easier to follow than Urotsukidōji: Legend of the Overfiend, due to Wicked City more linear and rapid storyline, and the lack of flashbacks and cyberpunk jargon that Savlov disliked in the genre. Savlov also appreciated the clarified animation. Savlov commented, "This may not be the second coming of Akira, but it's a step in the right direction."

Bob Strauss from Animation Magazine described it as "one of the strongest features to come out of Japan’s anime", presenting a seemingly incoherent scenario that "makes more sense as it climaxes, revealing a few solid, thematic reasons for what initially seemed to be inexplicable behavior, gratuitous sex and reckless sci-fi gimmickry." He added that there was also a "neat moral and spiritual subtext to the whole bizarre enterprise."

Chuck Arrington of DVD Talk, reviewing the DVD of the film, recommended that consumers "skip it", citing the transfer errors and scratches on the print, the at-times washed-out colors, and the uninteresting lengthy interview among the DVD's extras. Arrington thought that the visuals and the fight scenes were generally done well, and that the dubbing into English was acceptable, though exhibited some "wooden elements" endemic to all anime titles. Regarding the sexual violence in the film, Arrington found it excluded recommendation for most viewers, commenting, "Though not nearly as gruesome as Legend of the Overfiend, Wicked City is definitely not for children and not really for adults either."

Theron Martin of Anime News Network said that "in all, Wicked City isn't great fare, but if explicit, sexually-charged supernatural action stories appeal to you then it should fit the bill quite nicely."

Related films 
Wicked City, a Hong Kong live-action adaptation of the film was made in 1992 produced by Film Workshop Ltd. The film was directed by Tai Kit Mak, produced and written by Tsui Hark, and starred Jacky Cheung, Leon Lai, Michelle Reis, Yuen Woo-ping, Roy Cheung, and Tatsuya Nakadai. (Michelle Reis said that Tsui Hark actually directed many scenes himself.)

The story takes place in Hong Kong in a conflict between worlds of Humans and "Rapters". Special police in the city are investigating a mysterious drug named "happiness". Taki, one of the police, meets his old lover Windy, who is a rapter and now mistress of a powerful old rapter named Daishu. Taki and other special police track down and fight Daishu, but later find that he hopes to coexist with human. The son of Daishu, Shudo, is the mastermind. In the end, Shudo is defeated, but Daishu and Taki's friends die too. Windy leaves alone.

References

External links 
 
 
 

1987 films
1987 anime films
1987 directorial debut films
1987 horror films
1987 fantasy films
1987 thriller films

Animated thriller films
Dark fantasy anime and manga
Japanese dark fantasy films
Demons in film
Discotek Media
Erotic horror films
Films about parallel universes
Films based on Japanese novels
Films directed by Yoshiaki Kawajiri
Films set in Tokyo
Japanese action horror films
Japanese animated fantasy films
Japanese animated horror films
Japanese neo-noir films
Japanese horror thriller films
Japanese adult animated films
Madhouse (company)
Manga Entertainment
Sentai Filmworks
Thriller anime and manga
1980s exploitation films
Japanese splatter films